Shahriar may refer to:

Places

Cities in Iran
 Shahriar, Tehran Province
 Shahriar, East Azerbaijan

Counties in Iran
 Shahriar County

Villages in Iran
 Shahriar, Fars
 Shahriar, Lorestan
 Shahriar Kandeh
 Shahriari-ye Olya
 Shahriari-ye Sofla

People

Given name
 Shahriar Moghanlou (born 1994), Iranian footballer
 Shahriar Nafees (born 1985), Bangladeshi cricketer
 Shahriar Afshar (born 1971), Iranian-American physicist
 Shahriar Alam (politician) (born 1970), Bangladeshi politician
 Shahriar Bahrani (born 1951), Iranian film director
 Shahriar Hossain (born 1976), Bangladeshi cricketer
 Shahriar Sayeed Husain, Bangladeshi businessman
 Shahriar Nazim Joy, Bangladeshi actor, writer, and director
 Shahriar Kabir (born 1950), Bangladeshi journalist, filmmaker, human rights activist and author
 Shahriar Mandanipour (born 1957), Iranian writer, journalist and literary theorist
 Shahriar Manzoor (born 1976), Bangladeshi problem setter
 Shahriar Negahdaripour, American electronics engineer
 Shahriar Shafiq (1945–1979), Iranian royal and naval officer
 Shahriar Shirvand (born 1991), Iranian footballer

Surname
 Abu Hasan Shahriar (born 1959), Bangladeshi poet
 Hassan Shahriar (1946–2021), Bangladeshi journalist
 Maryam Shahriar (born 1966), Iranian film director and scriptwriter
 Munim Shahriar (born 1998), Bangladeshi cricketer
 Seyyed Mohammad-Hossein Behjat Tabrizi (Shahriar) (1906–1988), Iranian Azerbaijani bilingual poet's pen name

See also
 Shahriyar (disambiguation)